Promise is the debut album by British gothic rock band Gene Loves Jezebel. Released in 1983 by Situation Two, it peaked at No. 8 on the UK Indie Chart.

Critical reception
Trouser Press wrote that "the songs have a decidedly sexual air, but it’s the sheer din — roughly produced but convincing — that makes Promise worth repeated listenings."

Track listing
"Upstairs" (J. Aston, M. Aston, Hudson) – 3:18
"Bruises" (J. Aston, M. Aston) – 3:38
"Pop Tarantula" (J. Aston, M. Aston) – 3:10
"Screaming for Emmalene" (J. Aston, M. Aston) – 2:58
"Scheming" (J. Aston, M. Aston) – 6:26
"Bread from Heaven" (J. Aston, M. Aston, Hudson) – 4:12
"Influenza" (J. Aston, Hudson) – 3:42
"Shower Me with Brittle Punches" (J. Aston, M. Aston, Hudson) – 2:50
"Wraps and Arms" (J. Aston, M. Aston) – 4:00
"Psychological Problems" (J. Aston, M. Aston, Hudson) – 3:45

Special Edition bonus disc
"Shame" (Original Version) - 3:25
"Influenza" (Relapse) - 3:48
"Stephen" (Original Version) - 4:49
"Walking in the Park" - 4:06
"Wrap and Arms" (Version 2) - 4:00
"Bruises" (Extended Single Version) - 4:49
"Punch Drunk" - 2:23
"Brando (Bruises)" [Extended Version] - 4:58
"Scheming" (Original Version) - 3:33
"Screaming for Emmalene" (Single Version) - 3:55
"So Young (Heave Hard Heave Ho)" - 3:24
"No Voodoo Dollies" - 3:02
"Shaving My Neck" - 2:55
"Sun and Insanity" - 3:37
"Machismo" - 3:22
"Glad to Be Alive" - 5:38

Personnel
 John Aston - lead vocals, backing vocals, guitars
 Michael Aston - lead vocals
 Ian C. Hudson - guitars, bass
 Albie DeLuca - guitars
 Julianne Regan - bass, backing vocals, piano
 Steve Marshall - bass
with:
 Steve Goulding - drums, percussion
 Richard Hawkins - drums, percussion
 John "Johnny Genius" Murphy - drums, percussion
 Graeme Pleeth - keyboards
Technical
John Brand - producer, engineer
Louis Austin - engineer, mixing
John Madden, Nick Smith, Robin Springall - engineer

References 

1983 debut albums
Gene Loves Jezebel albums
Geffen Records albums